In mathematics, Scheffé's lemma is a proposition in measure theory concerning the convergence of sequences of integrable functions. It states that, if  is a sequence of integrable functions on a measure space  that converges almost everywhere to another integrable function , then  if and only if .

In probability theory, almost sure convergence can be weakened to requiring only convergence in probability.

Applications
Applied to probability theory, Scheffe's theorem, in the form stated here, implies that almost everywhere pointwise convergence of the probability density functions of a sequence of -absolutely continuous random variables implies convergence in distribution of those random variables.

History
Henry Scheffé published a proof of the statement on convergence of probability densities in 1947. The result is a special case of a theorem by Frigyes Riesz about convergence in Lp spaces published in 1928.

References 

Theorems in measure theory